Paul J. O'Brien (born 16 April 1961) is a former Australian rules footballer who played with Melbourne and Essendon in the Victorian Football League (VFL).

Notes

External links 

Paul O'Brien's profile at Demonwiki
Paul O'Brien's profile at Essendon's official website

1961 births
Melbourne Football Club players
Essendon Football Club players
Living people
Australian rules footballers from Victoria (Australia)